The  2011 MoveThatBlock.com Indy 225 was the fourth running of the New Hampshire 225 after a 13-year sabbatical, and the thirteenth round of the 2011 IndyCar Series season. It took place on Sunday, August 14, 2011. The race was contested over 225 laps at the  New Hampshire Motor Speedway in Loudon, New Hampshire, and was televised by ABC in the United States.

The winner of the 2011 race was Ryan Hunter-Reay. Dario Franchitti scored the pole position with a time of 43 seconds, while Scott Dixon had the fastest lap of the race, which he achieved on lap 149.  No drivers who participated in the last IndyCar race at New Hampshire Motor Speedway in 1998, did participate in this race.

The length of this race would be reduced to 215 laps / 220 miles (354 km) due to rain. The race was restarted with 10 laps to go. Wet conditions led to Danica Patrick spinning immediately when the green flag came out, resulting in a multiple car crash. Will Power, who was involved in the crash, was vocally angry regarding the call, with complaints stemming from the fact that the track was too wet for the race to be restarted. Oriol Servià took over the lead from Ryan Hunter-Reay during the last restart but because the restart heavily failed as the track was still too wet, the race ended up being red-flagged. The order of how the drivers were running before the aborted restart would count as the unofficial race result, which meant Ryan Hunter-Reay was declared the winner. Newman/Haas Racing and Chip Ganassi Racing filed protests regarding to the finish because of Servia's pass off Hunter-Reay on the aborted restart. The hearing was scheduled on August 22, which would also include Andretti Autosport. The unofficial results would not change and Ryan Hunter-Reay would become the official winner of the race.

MoveThatBlock.com Indy 225
MoveThatBlock.com Indy 225
MoveThatBlock.com Indy 225
New Hampshire Indy 225